Khawkawn is a village in the Champhai district of Mizoram, India. It is located in the Ngopa R.D. Block, near the state's border with Manipur. It is located at an elevation of 1,257 m above MSL.

Demographics 

According to the 2011 census of India, Khawkawn has 161 households. The effective literacy rate (i.e. the literacy rate of population excluding children aged 6 and below) is 97.88%.

References 

Villages in Ngopa block